Petr Svoboda is a Czech ice hockey player.

Other people with this name include:
Petr Svoboda (ice hockey, born 1980), Czech ice hockey player
Petr Svoboda (track athlete) (born 1984), Czech track and field athlete